Barrio (Barriu) is one of thirteen parishes (administrative divisions) in Teverga, a municipality within the province and autonomous community of Asturias, in northern Spain.  

It covers a land area of, with a population of 40 (INE 2006). The postal code is 33111.

Villages and hamlets
Barrio 
Cuña

References

Parishes in Teverga